The Crown is a historical drama television series about the reign of Queen Elizabeth II, created and principally written by Peter Morgan, and produced by Left Bank Pictures and Sony Pictures Television for Netflix.  The first season was released on Netflix on 4 November 2016, the second on 8 December 2017, the third on 17 November 2019, and the fourth on 15 November 2020. The fifth season was released on 9 November 2022.

 In July 2020, Netflix announced that the series would receive a sixth and final season.

Series overview

Episodes

Season 1 (2016)

Season 2 (2017)

Season 3 (2019)

Season 4 (2020)

Season 5 (2022)

Season 6

References

External links 
 
 

 
Lists of American drama television series episodes
Lists of British drama television series episodes